Tetracha nicaraguensis is a species of tiger beetle that was described by Johnson in 1993.

References

Cicindelidae
Insects of Central America
Beetles described in 1993